N. Mathrubootham (2 July 1944 – 18 November 2004) was an Indian psychiatrist, writer, actor and director who was known for his work on sex education. He also acted as a comedian in some Tamil films.

Early life 

Mathrubootham was born in an Iyer family in Tiruchirappalli on 2 July 1944. He had his early education in Tiruchirappalli and obtained his M. B. B. S. degree from the Stanley Medical College, Chennai in 1966. Mathrubootham went on to pursue his master's degree and obtained a doctorate in psychiatry. On completion of his doctorate studies, he joined Institute of Mental Health, Chennai as a lecturer.

Career 

Joining the Institute of Mental Health as a lecturer, Mathrubootham rose to become Professor of Psychiatry. He also served simultaneously as Psychiatry Professor at Kilpauk Medical College. Mathrubootham was awarded the Dr. Marfatia award by the Indian Psychiatrists Association for his research on alcohol addiction and the Pinnacle award for his multilingual sex education film "Puthira Punithama".

Death 

In his later life, Mathrubootham suffered from arthritis and renal diseases. He died on 18 November 2004 due to cardiac arrest.

Filmography 

Mathrubootham also acted in summary roles as comedian in a few Tamil films along with Vivek.

Director
Puthira Punithama (1999)

Actor

Notes 

1944 births
2004 deaths
Tamil comedians
Male actors from Tiruchirappalli
Indian psychiatrists
Male actors in Tamil cinema
Indian male comedians
20th-century Indian male actors
21st-century Indian male actors
20th-century comedians
People from Tiruchirappalli